The 2022–23 Russian Second League is the 31st season of Russia's third-tier football league since the dissolution of the Soviet Union. The season began on 15 July 2022. On 23 June 2022, the league was renamed from Russian Football National League 2 to Russian Second League.

The Russian Second League is geographically divided into 4 groups.
The winners of each zone are automatically promoted into the First League. The bottom finishers of each zone lose professional status and are relegated into the Amateur Football League.

Group 1

First stage

Standings

Second stage 
At the second stage, the teams of subgroup A retain the statistics from the first stage (points, wins, draws, losses, scored and missed goals). The teams of subgroup B retain the statistics from the first stage only in matches against teams from subgroup. Thus, before the second stage, new standings are formed in subgroup B. The teams in each subgroup will play in a single round-robin tournament.

The winner of subgroup A becomes the winner of the group and can qualify to the First league. The two last teams of subgroup B (13th and 14th places in the group) eliminate from the Second League.

Group 2

First stage

Subgroup 1

Standings

Subgroup 2

Standings

Second stage 
At the second stage, the teams of subgroup A retain the statistics from the first stage (points, wins, draws, losses, scored and missed goals). The teams of subgroup B retain the statistics from the first stage only in matches against teams from subgroup. Thus, before the second stage, new standings are formed in subgroup B. The teams in each subgroup will play in a double round-robin tournament.

The winner of subgroup A becomes the winner of the group and can qualify to the First league. The three last teams of subgroup B (8th, 9th and 10th places in the subgroup) eliminate from the Second League.

Group 3

First stage

Subgroup 1

Standings

Subgroup 2

Standings

Second stage 
At the second stage, the teams of subgroup A retain the statistics from the first stage (points, wins, draws, losses, scored and missed goals). The teams of subgroup B retain the statistics from the first stage only in matches against teams from subgroup. Thus, before the second stage, new standings are formed in subgroup B. The teams in each subgroup will play in a double round-robin tournament.

The winner of subgroup A becomes the winner of the group and can qualify to the First league. The three last teams of subgroup B (10th, 11th and 12th places in the subgroup) eliminate from the Second League.

Group 4

First stage

Standings

Second stage 
At the second stage, the teams of subgroup A retain the statistics from the first stage (points, wins, draws, losses, scored and missed goals). The teams of subgroup B retain the statistics from the first stage only in matches against teams from subgroup. Thus, before the second stage, new standings are formed in subgroup B. The teams in each subgroup will play in a single round-robin tournament.

The winner of subgroup A becomes the winner of the group and can qualify to the First league. The two last teams of subgroup B (11th and 12th places in the group) eliminate from the Second League.

References

2022-23
3
Rus